Patavious Lashun Isom (born May 1, 1992), better known by his stage name Duke Deuce, is an American rapper from Memphis, Tennessee. Currently signed to Quality Control Music, he is best known for his song "Crunk Ain't Dead", which received a remix with fellow Memphis rappers Juicy J (who also produced the song) and Project Pat, as well as Atlanta rapper and record producer Lil Jon. He released his debut studio album, Duke Nukem, on February 26, 2021, which debuted at number three on the Billboard Heatseekers Albums chart.

Career 
Isom rose to fame with his single "Yeh", but gained more recognition with his track "Crunk Ain't Dead", which received a remix featuring Lil Jon, Juicy J and Project Pat. The track later served as the lead single from his third mixtape Memphis Massacre 2, which was released on February 19, 2020.

Isom's debut studio album, Duke Nukem, was released on February 26, 2021, and debuted at number three on the Billboard Heatseekers Albums chart.

His sophomore album Crunkstar was released on June 17, 2022.

Discography

Studio albums

Compilation albums

Mixtapes

Singles

As lead artist

As featured artist

References 

1992 births
Living people
21st-century American male musicians
21st-century American rappers
African-American male rappers
21st-century African-American male singers
African-American songwriters
Quality Control artists
Motown artists
Rappers from Memphis, Tennessee
Southern hip hop musicians